The Grand Knight of Valour is the highest federal award which can be presented in Malaysia. It was created on 29 July 1960 and was gazetted on 11 August 1960. The award is the highest ranking in the list of the Malaysian Federal Ranking of Awards, and is ranked higher than the Order of the Royal Family of Malaysia (D.K.M.) awarded to Malaysian Royalty.

Criteria
The Grand Knight of Valour is awarded to those Malaysians who have shown, "supreme courage and bravery in extraordinary and highly dangerous situations". The number of awards is not limited, and may be conferred to any eligible person, both civilian and military.

Entitlements

The Grand Knight of Valour, as the highest Armed Forces Gallantry Award, is the highest in the order of precedence in the awards and decorations of the Malaysian Armed Forces. It is also the highest award of the Malaysian Federal Awards, outranking the awards which carry the title of Datuk, Tan Sri, or Tun.

The award does not carry any title and is not listed in the Federal Order of Precedence. Since 1990, the award does carry a monetary stipend. With the passage of the Seri Pahlawan Gagah Perkasa (Remembrance Allowance) Act 1990, recipients and their families are entitled to a monetary allowance.

Living recipients of the decoration are paid an allowance of RM 400 per month. Those who had received the award prior to the passage of the act, were paid retroactively to the date of their award, but not any earlier than June 1983. The allowance ends upon the death of the recipient. A posthumous recipient's next of kin receives a lump-sum payment of RM 20,000.

Appearance
The medal pendant is made of silver. It is a crescent moon with the inscription Gagah Perkasa. Within arc of the moon is a fourteen-pointed star. An intricately designed clasp attaches the pendant to the ribbon. The medal's ribbon is royal yellow 1.5 inches wide with red stripes 1/8 inches wide.

Recipients
Official source

S.P.
The recipients does not receive any title.

References

External links
 Malaysia: Supreme Gallantry Award

Civil awards and decorations of Malaysia
Military awards and decorations of Malaysia
Awards established in 1960
1960 establishments in Malaya